is a passenger railway station in located in the city of Hashimoto, Wakayama Prefecture, Japan, operated by West Japan Railway Company (JR West).

Lines
Kii-Yamada Station is served by the Wakayama Line, and is located 48.0 kilometers from the terminus of the line at Ōji Station.

Station layout
The station consists of one side platform serving a single bi-directional track. There is no station building, but the platform and track are located a cutting, with the floor of the station parking lot extending over a portion of the platform to form a weather shelter. The station is unattended.

Adjacent stations

|-
!colspan=5|West Japan Railway Company

History
Kii-Yamada Station opened on October 1, 1952. With the privatization of the Japan National Railways (JNR) on April 1, 1987, the station came under the aegis of the West Japan Railway Company.

Passenger statistics
In fiscal 2019, the station was used by an average of 595 passengers daily (boarding passengers only).

Surrounding Area
 Shokoji Temple
Hikarisanbo-arashin Shrine
 Wakayama Prefectural Kihoku Technical High School

See also
List of railway stations in Japan

References

External links

 0621815 Kii-Yamada Station Official Site

Railway stations in Wakayama Prefecture
Railway stations in Japan opened in 1952
Hashimoto, Wakayama